Suhaee Abro is a Pakistani dancer and actress. She specialises in the field of dance and is a trained classical dancer. Suhaee works in television plays, theatre, documentaries and music videos. She won best New Television Sensation Award (Female) at 1st Hum Awards 2013. She is the daughter of Sindhi poet and activist Attiya Dawood.

Early life
Suhaee Abro was born and raised in Karachi, Pakistan. Her mother (Attiya Dawood) is a well-known poet. Her father (Khuda Bux Abro), a visual artist, introduced her to many different kinds of world music.

Abro began her training in classical dance at the age of seven from classical dancer Sheema Kermani, and performed in her first music video at the age of eight. She began appearing in telefilms when she was twelve.

In 2010, after an injury that required surgery to her tailbone, Abro's doctor warned her not to dance. Because she had promised to perform a dance at her school, however, Abro performed sitting on the edge of the stage, just moving her hands and face, earning applause from the audience.

Abro was diagnosed with epilepsy in her late teens.

Career as a dancer
Having already performed in many music videos, Abro gave her first public solo performance in 2011, at Karachi's T2F, at an evening of some of her mother's poetry.

Abro specialises in Bharatanatyam, and has also learnt Kathak and Odissi, three of eight forms of Indian classical dance and also choreographing and performing Sufi, folk, modern/contemporary as well other genres of classical dance. Abro is also one of the founders and Dance Director/Performing Artist of the group Nritaal

Dances and choreography

Filmography

Theatre

Music videos

References

External links

Living people
Pakistani television actresses
Actresses from Karachi
Pakistani female dancers
Pakistani music educators
Bharatanatyam exponents
Contemporary dancers
21st-century Pakistani actresses
Pakistani stage actresses
Performers of Indian classical dance
Sindhi people
Year of birth missing (living people)